The Ministry of Employment Guarantee is a Ministry of the Government of Maharashtra. 
state. 

The Ministry is headed by a cabinet level Minister. Sandipanrao Bhumre''' is Current Minister of Employment Guarantee Government of Maharashtra.

Head office

List of Cabinet Ministers

List of Ministers of State

References 

Government of Maharashtra
Government ministries of Maharashtra